is a 1984 light gun shooter video game developed and published by Nintendo for the Nintendo Entertainment System (NES) video game console and the Nintendo Vs. System arcade hardware. The game was first released in April 1984, in Japan for the Family Computer (Famicom) console and in North America as an arcade game. It was then released as a launch game for the NES in North America in October 1985, with it also releasing in Europe two years later.

In Duck Hunt, players use the NES Zapper in combination with a CRT television to shoot ducks that appear on the screen. The ducks appear one or two at a time, and the player is given three shots to shoot them down. The player receives points upon shooting each duck. If the player shoots the required number of ducks in a single round, the player will advance to the next round; otherwise, the player will receive a game over.

The game initially received a positive reception in the mid-1980s, but was later given mild critical praise in retrospective reviews. Prior to the NES version, Nintendo also made a Duck Hunt game based on the Laser Clay Shooting System released in 1976. Upon release as a video game, Duck Hunt became a major commercial success both for arcades and consoles in the 1980s, helping to popularize light gun video games and selling over 28 million copies worldwide.

Beginning with the nationwide roll-out of the NES in 1986, Duck Hunt was one of several titles Nintendo included as a pack-in game with some of its releases. The initial Deluxe Set included Duck Hunt and Gyromite. The later Action Set was packaged with Duck Hunt and Super Mario Bros., which was the pack-in for an upgraded Basic Set; unlike with those releases, Nintendo opted to place both games on one cartridge as opposed to having separate individual cartridges. The last NES release to include Duck Hunt as a pack-in was the Power Set, which came with the Power Pad; for that particular release, the multicart added World Class Track Meet as a third selectable game with Duck Hunt and Super Mario Bros. The game was released as a Virtual Console title for the Wii U in 2014.

Gameplay

Duck Hunt is a shooter game in which the objective is to shoot moving targets on the screen in mid-flight. The game is played from a first-person perspective and requires the NES Zapper light gun, which the player aims and fires at the screen. It also requires a CRT television screen since the Zapper gun will not work with LCD or HDTVs. Each round consists of a total of ten targets to shoot. Depending on the game mode the player selects prior to beginning play, one or two targets will appear on the screen at any given time, and the player has three attempts to hit them before they disappear.

The player is required to successfully shoot a minimum number of targets in order to advance to the next round. Therefore, failure will result directly in a game over. The difficulty increases as the player advances to higher rounds; targets will move faster, and the minimum number of targets to shoot will increase. The player receives points upon shooting a target and will also receive bonus points for shooting all ten targets in a single round. Duck Hunt keeps track of the players' highest score for all games played in a single session; it is lost, however, upon shutting the game off.

Duck Hunt has three different game modes to choose from. In "Game A" and "Game B", the targets are flying ducks in a woodland area, and in "Game C" the targets are clay pigeons that are launched away from the player's perspective into the distance. In "Game A", only one duck will appear on the screen at a time while in "Game B" two ducks will appear at a time. "Game A" allows a second player to control the movement of the flying ducks by using a normal NES controller. The gameplay starts at Round 1 and may continue up to Round 99. If the player completes Round 99, they will advance to Round 0, which is a kill screen (in "Game A") where the game behaves erratically, such as targets that move haphazardly or do not appear at all and eventually ends.

Vs. Duck Hunt
Duck Hunt was released as an arcade game in the Nintendo VS. series as Vs. Duck Hunt in April 1984, and was later included in the PlayChoice-10 arcade console. The console supports two light guns, allowing two players at once.

Gameplay consists of alternating rounds of Games B and C, with 12 ducks/targets per round instead of 10 and sometimes requires the player to shoot three ducks/targets at a time instead of two. In addition, the player is given a limited number of lives; every duck/target that is not hit costs one life. When all lives are gone, the game ends.

After every second round, a bonus stage is played in which ducks can be shot for points as they fly out of the grass. However, the hunting dog occasionally jumps out, putting himself in the line of fire and creating a distraction. If the player shoots the dog, the bonus stage immediately ends.

Development

Duck Hunt is based on a 1976 electronic toy version titled Beam Gun: Duck Hunt, part of the Beam Gun series. The toy version was designed by Gunpei Yokoi and Masayuki Uemura for Nintendo. Nintendo Research & Development 1 developed both Duck Hunt for the NES and the NES Zapper. The game was supervised by Takehiro Izushi, and was produced by Gunpei Yokoi. The music was composed by Hirokazu Tanaka, who did music for several other Nintendo games at the time. The game's music was represented in the classic games medley on the Video Games Live concert tour. Designer Hiroji Kiyotake created the graphics and characters.

Release
Duck Hunt has been placed in several combination ROM cartridges. In the Action Set configuration of the NES in the late 1980s, Duck Hunt was included with Super Mario Bros. This particular cartridge is found very often in the United States, due to it being included with the purchase of a NES. A Power Set was also available, which included the Action Set, the Power Pad and a 3-in-1 cartridge that included Duck Hunt, World Class Track Meet, and Super Mario Bros.

Duck Hunt was re-released as a downloaded Virtual Console title for the Wii U console in Japan on December 24, 2014, and internationally on December 25. This version is modified to require a Wii Remote controller in place of the NES Zapper to aim and shoot targets on the screen.

Reception

In North America, the Nintendo Vs. System version of Duck Hunt became popular in arcades and popularized light gun video games along with Nintendo's Hogan's Alley by 1985. Vs. Duck Hunt was the third top-grossing arcade software on the RePlay arcade charts in November 1985, below Vs. Hogan's Alley at number one. It came bundled with the Nintendo Entertainment System console 1985, and went on to sell  copies worldwide.

Upon release in arcades, Eddie Adlum of RePlay magazine praised both Duck Hunt and Hogan's Alley, calling them the "cream on the cake" among the Nintendo VS. System titles and noting they successfully captured the experience of older electro-mechanical gun games in video game format. He said Duck Hunt and Hogan's Alley "sported simulated handguns on a wire capble and pop, pop, pop, you do your thing just like in the old days only at video targets."

AllGame called the game an "attractive but repetitive target shooter" and "utterly mindless... the game is fun for a short time, but gets old after a few rounds of play". Several user groups have rated the game positively. 1UP.com users gave it an 8.7 out of 10, and the GameSpot community gave the Mario-Duck Hunt package a 9.1 out of 10. It was rated the 150th best game made on a Nintendo System in Nintendo Power's Top 200 Games list. IGN also placed the game at number 77 on its "Top 100 NES Games of All Time" feature. The game was ranked 24th in GamesRadar’s "The best NES games of all time". Jeremy Parish of USgamer stated that Duck Hunt paired with the NES Zapper "made the NES memorable" and was one of the key factors behind the success of the NES. Parish related Duck Hunt to the Wii Remote of the Wii in that they made their respective consoles more approachable and reach a wider demographic.

Legacy

Duck Hunt features a nameless non-playable hunting dog, known simply as "Dog" according to his collectable trophy in Super Smash Bros. for Wii U, and often referred to by the media as the "Duck Hunt Dog" or the "Laughing Dog". The dog accompanies the player in the "Game A" and "Game B" modes, in which he serves to both flush (spook) the ducks and retrieve any fallen ones. The dog is notorious for laughing at the player whenever the player fails to shoot any of the ducks on screen. The dog's perceived "smugness" has seen the character appear on several "best of" or "top" lists.

The dog makes a cameo appearance in the NES game Barker Bill's Trick Shooting (another Zapper game) and he can be shot. In Wii Play (2006) and its sequel Wii Play: Motion (2011) some elements from Duck Hunt and Hogan's Alley are included in the mini-games "Shooting Range" and "Trigger Twist" in which some of the various targets are ducks and cans. In the 2014 fighting games Super Smash Bros. for Nintendo 3DS and Wii U, the dog and one of the ducks appear collectively as playable characters under the name "Duck Hunt", or "Duck Hunt Duo" in PAL releases. Masahiro Sakurai, the creator and director of the Super Smash Bros. series, stated that Duck Hunts commercial success as "the most-sold shooting game in the world" was one of the primary reasons for the team's inclusion. In the games, the Duck Hunt team utilizes multiple attacks related to the NES Zapper, including throwing clay pigeons; kicking an explosive version of the can from Hogan's Alley; being able to summon the cast of Wild Gunman to fire at opponents with their guns; or comically dodging shots fired at opponents from the Zapper. The games also feature an unlockable Duck Hunt-themed stage. Both the Duck Hunt team and stage reappear in Super Smash Bros. Ultimate, and the team is featured in the June 2019 trailer announcing Banjo and Kazooie as downloadable content for Ultimate.

In the 2015 film Pixels, the dog has a cameo appearance, where it is given as a "trophy" by the aliens when Sam Brenner (Adam Sandler) and Ludlow Lamonsoff (Josh Gad) defeat the creatures of the video game Centipede in London. The dog is adopted by an old woman who was present during the attack.

The premise for the psychological horror VR game Duck Season by Stress Level Zero is based in part on Duck Hunt.

See also
 Laser Clay Shooting System
 Qwak!

Notes

References

External links
 
 Duck Hunt at NinDB

1984 video games
Arcade video games
First-person shooters
Hunting video games
Intelligent Systems games
Light gun games
Nintendo arcade games
Nintendo Entertainment System games
Nintendo games
Nintendo Research & Development 1 games
Nintendo Vs. Series games
Pack-in video games
PlayChoice-10 games
Ducks in popular culture
Video games about birds
Video games about dogs
Video games developed in Japan
Video games directed by Shigeru Miyamoto
Video games scored by Hirokazu Tanaka
Virtual Console games
Virtual Console games for Wii U